The Delawana Inn was a family hotel/resort in Honey Harbour on Georgian Bay, Ontario and now called Delawana Resort.

History

The evolution of the tourism industry in Simcoe County and Muskoka followed the great water routes of the trappers, loggers, and voyageurs.

Honey Harbour and the site of the Delawana Inn had all of the natural features of a good harbour, protection from the elements, and a beach area for bathing.

The sharp eye of entrepreneur Nathan Nickerson identified the site as a perfect location for a hotel. Nickerson and his wife Anne, had operated a store in Midland for twelve years, a sawmill, Nickerson Brothers' Mills in Hogg's Bay, (Victoria Harbour) and with his sons Albert and Charles, established the hotel known as the Victoria House on the present site of The Delawana Inn & Resort.

When the hotel opened its doors in 1897, Mr. Nickerson was approximately seventy years old. People thought he "lost his mind", to leave such a lucrative business as the lumber trade, but Nathan was convinced that the Honey Harbour district would become more popular for tourism than the famed Thousand Islands of the St. Lawrence.

For fifteen cents, according to the ad in the Midland Free Press, the steamer "Odessa" would take guests from Victoria Harbour to Honey Harbour. All guests and supplies had to be transported by boat since there were no roads. Accommodations were available for the night or the week. Guests had the use of boats, meals were supplied, picnic lunches created, and ice cream and confectioneries were available. The hotel was a two-story wooden structure with extensive verandahs. During the early years, Victoria House was a popular fishing camp without electricity or telephones!

In the 1920s, Charles Nickerson, Nathan's son, sold Victoria House to the Grisé brothers; they had operated The Royal Hotel (a four storey building with a dock c. 1903 and closed mid 1970s then demolished) across the channel on Royal Island. Fred Grisé, who had managed a liquor store in Penetanguishene until prohibition ended that venture, took over the operation of the mainland hotel. Fred's son, Didace, along with Fred's daughter-in-law, Mary, became the managers. Didace and Mary raised five sons and four daughters while running the resort!

It was under the Grisé family that the hotel became The Delawana Inn. Legend has it that a local Chief named Delawana suffered a great tragedy when a rock-fall killed his daughter, Wah-Soo-na, and her two dogs. The Great Spirit gave the area its beautiful birch trees in her memory and the people named Big Dog and Little Dog Channels for her companion pets.

Still in the 1920s, and due to the popularity of The Delawana, more cabins were built to increase capacity. Lighting was by acetylene, water was heated by wood, laundry was done by hand and huge icehouses provided refrigeration.

By 1935, the Marine Wing was added, providing twenty more rooms, two of which had private baths. Four rooms in the main building contained a bath, eleven had running water, and the remaining seventeen had "still water service". The new kitchen had a dishwasher and oil-fired stoves. Capacity at The Delawana was one hundred guests, most of them fishermen.

Didace Grisé was always aware of what other hotels offered and constantly strove to make his hotel competitive and up –to- date. He enlisted dietitians to work in the kitchen; telephones were available twenty-four hours a day, CNR telegrams were sent and received and running water was installed during the war years.

The sad but serendipitous opportunity to upgrade came in the form of a fire in August 1952, which burned the main building to the ground. The Grisés did not have insurance, so they turned to private financing and reopened in the following spring. The new main building contained ten rooms, which qualified The Delawana for a beer and wine license. More units with private baths were built and the increased prices were met with some resistance. An aggressive advertising campaign soon attracted conference groups. In July 1973, a second fire destroyed the building and again the family rebuilt. Didace Grise died in 1974, leaving ownership to Mary Grise and two of her sons.

From Inn to Resort

The changing nature of travel and tourism saw many Canadians venture off to new foreign destinations, and many Americans just stopped traveling north. In 1996 the resort changed hands, was purchased by a development company from Toronto and went into receivership in 2013. 

Under new ownership, the resort reopened in 2014. 

The resort now offers suite units, self catered rooms and individual cottages to patrons of Delawana.

In 2015 the Delawana Inn changed its name to Delawana Resort (dropping the word 'inn' while still keeping the historical 'Delawana'). This was to prevent confusion due to the lack of an actual inn being on the property anymore.

External links
Delawana Resort

Buildings and structures in the District Municipality of Muskoka
Resorts in Canada